Ramon Arens Bieri (June 16, 1929 – May 27, 2001) was an American actor who starred in many films and TV shows.

Television work
Bieri starred as the title character in the NBC sitcom Joe's World, from December 1979 to July 1980, playing Joe Wabash, a Detroit housepainter with a wife and five kids.  He co-starred on the short-lived 1981 TV series Bret Maverick with James Garner, as banker Elijah Crow. Bieri appeared in many TV movies as well. In 1971–1972, he played Lieutenant Barney Verick in the NBC drama Sarge.  Bieri also played in the second season of Barnaby Jones; episode titled, "Death Leap"(09/23/1973).

His movie roles included Badlands, The Sicilian, The Grasshopper, which was his first film, Grandview, U.S.A., Reds, and The Andromeda Strain.

Bieri made guest appearances in many TV shows, including  Daniel Boone, Gunsmoke, Little House on the Prairie, Bonanza, Hawaii Five-O, Kolchak: The Night Stalker, The Rockford Files, Buck Rogers in the 25th Century, The Dukes of Hazzard, The Partridge Family, Hogan's Heroes, Quincy, M.E., Mannix and Knight Rider in two episodes, playing a different villain in each. He was featured in recurring roles in Room 222 (as the vice principal) and St. Elsewhere. Bieri also appeared in "The Final Chapter," the first episode of the 1977 NBC series Quinn Martin's Tales of the Unexpected (known in the United Kingdom as Twist in the Tale), and in the "Murder! Murder!" episode of the NBC series The Eddie Capra Mysteries in 1978. His last role was in an episode of HBO's Arliss that aired in August, 2001 which was a little over two months after his death.

Death
Bieri died of cancer in Woodland Hills, California, on May 27, 2001, at age 71.

Filmography

References

External links
 

1929 births
2001 deaths
American male film actors
American male television actors
Deaths from cancer in California
Male actors from Los Angeles
Male actors from St. Louis
20th-century American male actors